Musique de Film Imaginé is the fourteenth studio album by The Brian Jonestown Massacre, released on April 27, 2015.

The album is a soundtrack for an imaginary French film and pays homage to the great European film directors of the late 1950s and 1960s such as François Truffaut and Jean-Luc Godard. It includes guest performances from the French multi-instrumentalist SoKo and Italian actress, singer, and director Asia Argento. Musique de Film Imaginé was recorded in Berlin in August 2014.

Track listing

References

2015 albums
The Brian Jonestown Massacre albums